Abdoulaye Maïga is a Malian personal name. It may refer to:

 Abdoulaye Maïga, ambassador of Mali to the United States in 1960 
 Abdoulaye Maïga (officer) (born 1981), appointed interim prime minister of Mali in August 2022
 Abdoulaye Idrissa Maïga (born 1958), prime minister of Mali from 8 April 2017 to 29 December 2017
 Abdoulaye Maïga (footballer) (born 1988), Malian football centre back